The 1997–98 UMass Minutemen basketball team represented the University of Massachusetts Amherst during the 1997–98 NCAA Division I men's basketball season. The Minutemen, led by second year head coach Bruiser Flint, played their home games at William D. Mullins Memorial Center and are members of the Atlantic 10 Conference. They finished the season 21–11, 12–4 in A-10 play to finish in third place.

Roster

Schedule

|-
!colspan=9| Regular Season

|-
!colspan=9| 1998 Atlantic 10 men's basketball tournament

|-
!colspan=9| 1998 NCAA Division I men's basketball tournament

References

UMass Minutemen basketball seasons
UMass